Shisiwani National Park (French: Parc National Shisiwani) is a national park along the Sima Peninsula in the eastern Comoros. It includes marine, coastal, and terrestrial areas along the western arm of the island of Anjouan. Its creation was announced in 2016 as part of a government effort to protect 25% of the Comoros by 2021.  The park encompasses a saddle island and Ile de la selle off the tip of the peninsula and includes a significant coral reef and mangrove forest.

References

National parks of the Comoros